The Morava Banovina or Morava Banate, was a province (banovina) of the Kingdom of Yugoslavia between 1929 and 1941. This province consisted of parts of present-day Central Serbia (including Vučitrn and Podujevo in Kosovo) and it was named after the Morava Rivers. The capital city of the Morava Banovina was Niš.

Borders
According to the 1931 Constitution of the Kingdom of Yugoslavia, 
''The Morava Banovina is bounded on the north and the east by the State frontiers with Romania and Bulgaria as for as the southern boundary of the district of Lužnica (at Descani Kladenac). From this point the boundary of the Banovina follows the southern boundaries of the districts of Lužnica, Niš, Dobrić, Prokuplje, Kosanica, Lab and Vučitrn, including all these districts, and at the intersection of the boundaries of the three districts of Vučitrn, Gračanica and Drenica it joins the boundary of the Zeta Banovina. The boundary then continues northwards, coinciding with the boundaries of the Zeta, Drina, and Danube Banovinas.

History
In 1941, the World War II Axis Powers occupied the Morava Banovina and it was made part of German and Bulgaria -occupied Serbia and Italian-occupied Albania. Following World War II, the region was made a part of Serbia within a federal Socialist Yugoslavia.

See also
Southern and Eastern Serbia

Notes and references 
Notes

References
The Constitution of the Kingdom of Yugoslavia

Yugoslav Serbia
History of Kosovo
Banovinas of the Kingdom of Yugoslavia
1929 establishments in Yugoslavia
1941 disestablishments in Yugoslavia